The Whirlpool is a 1927 Soviet silent film directed by Pavel Petrov-Bytov.

Plot summary

Cast
 Tatyana Guretskaya 
 F. Mikhajlov

References

Bibliography 
 Christie, Ian & Taylor, Richard. The Film Factory: Russian and Soviet Cinema in Documents 1896-1939. Routledge, 2012.

External links 
 

1927 films
Soviet silent films
1920s Russian-language films
Soviet black-and-white films